Samuel Farrow Rice (June 2, 1816 – January 3, 1890) was an American jurist and politician. He was a member of the Alabama House of Representatives and the Alabama Senate. He served as the tenth Chief Justice of the Supreme Court of Alabama from 1856 to 1859.

Early life
Samuel Farrow Rice was born on June 2, 1816, in Union County, South Carolina. His father, Judge William Rice, served as a member of the South Carolina Senate. His mother, Sarah Pines Herndon, was the sister of Colonel Zachariah Pines Herndon. One of his maternal aunts married Congressman Samuel Farrow.

Rice graduated from South Carolina College, now known as the University of South Carolina, in 1833. He went on to study the law under Senator William C. Preston, and he was admitted to the bar in 1837.

Career
Rice began his legal career in Winnsboro, South Carolina, but settled to Talladega, Alabama in 1838, where he opened a practice with Senator John Tyler Morgan. He was also a newspaper editor, the Democratic Watchtower, for six years. He served as a member of the Alabama House of Representatives for Talladega County from 1840 to 1841. He ran for the United States Congress in 1845, 1848 and 1851, but lost each time.

Rice moved to Montgomery in 1852. By 1855, he became associate judge on the Supreme Court of Alabama. He served as its chief justice from 1856 to 1859. He served as a member of the Alabama House of Representatives for Montgomery County in 1859, and as a member of the Alabama Senate for Montgomery County and Autauga County during the American Civil War of 1861–1865.

After the war, Rice joined the Republican Party. He was a delegate at Alabama's 1875 Constitutional Convention. He served as a member of the Alabama House of Representatives for Montgomery County in 1876. He also opened a legal practice with Confederate Major Henry C. Semple.

Personal life and death

Rice was married twice. He first married Amanda Butler in 1835. They resided in the Rice-Semple-Haardt House, which he built in the 1850s. Amanda Butler Rice died November 30, 1869, in Montgomery, Alabama and is buried with their son, Samuel Farrow Rice, Jr.  After Amanda's death, Samuel F. Rice, Sr. married Mary Ellen Fitzgibbon  on October 8, 1872. In addition to son Samuel, he fathered two daughters, Mrs Daisy Glaze and Marguerite Riley.

Rice died of heart disease on January 3, 1890, in Montgomery.

References
6.Alabama County Marriages, 1809–1950," database with images, FamilySearch

Samuel F Rice and Ellen Fitzgibbons, 08 Oct 1872; citing Montgomery, Alabama, United States, County Probate Courts, Alabama; FHL microfilm 2,358,617.

1816 births
1890 deaths
19th-century American judges
19th-century American lawyers
19th-century American newspaper editors
19th-century American politicians
Republican Party Alabama state senators
Chief Justices of the Supreme Court of Alabama
Editors of Alabama newspapers
Justices of the Supreme Court of Alabama
Lawyers from Montgomery, Alabama
Republican Party members of the Alabama House of Representatives
People from Union County, South Carolina
Politicians from Montgomery, Alabama
U.S. state supreme court judges admitted to the practice of law by reading law
University of South Carolina alumni